Sufi Sheykh Gharavi (also Romanized as Şūfī Sheykh Gharāvī) is a village in Tamran Rural District, in the Central District of Kalaleh County, Golestan Province, Iran. At the 2006 census, its population was 1,178, in 235 families.

References 

Populated places in Kalaleh County